Eta Boötis (η Boötis, abbreviated Eta Boo, η Boo) is a binary star in the constellation of Boötes. Based on parallax measurements obtained during the Hipparcos mission, it is approximately 37 light-years (11 parsecs) distant from the Sun. Since 1943, the spectrum of this star has served as one of the stable anchor points by which other stars are classified. It forms a double star with the star BD+19 2726.

As a constituent of a double pair, Eta Boötis is also designated WDS J13547+1824A, with its two components being designated Aa (formally named Muphrid , the traditional name for the entire system) and Ab. (As part of a binary pair, they are also designated Eta Boötis A and B, respectively.) BD +19 2726 is also designated WDS J13547+1824B.

Nomenclature
η Boötis (Latinised to Eta Boötis) is the binary pair's Bayer designation; η Boötis A and B those of its two components. The designations of the two constituents of the double pair as WDS J13547+1824A and B and those of A's components - Aa and Ab - derive from the convention used by the Washington Multiplicity Catalog (WMC) for multiple star systems, and adopted by the International Astronomical Union (IAU).

Eta Boötis bore the traditional names Muphrid and Saak. Muphrid is from the Arabic مفرد الرامح mufrid ar-rāmiħ "the (single) one of the lancer". In 2016, the IAU organized a Working Group on Star Names (WGSN) to catalogue and standardize proper names for stars. The WGSN decided to attribute proper names to individual stars rather than entire multiple systems. It approved the name Muphrid for the component WDS J13547+1824Aa (Eta Boötis A) on 12 September 2016 and it is now so included in the List of IAU-approved Star Names.

In the catalogue of stars in the Calendarium of Al Achsasi al Mouakket, this star was designated Ramih al Ramih (رمح الرامح rumḥ al rāmiḥ), which was translated into Latin as Lancea Lanceator, possibly meaning the lance of the lancer.

Properties

Eta Boötis is a suspected spectroscopic binary with a reported period of 494 days, but the companion was not confirmed through speckle interferometry. This measurement does not rule out a low mass stellar companion of spectral class M7.

Eta Boötis presents as a subgiant that has begun the process of evolving from a main sequence star into a red giant. It has about 1.7 times the mass of the Sun and 2.7 times the Sun's radius. The estimated age of this star is about 2.7 billion years. Based on its spectra, it has a significant excess of elements heavier than helium. In fact the ratio of iron to hydrogen is considered close to the upper limit for dwarf stars in the galactic disk.

Eta Boötis appears close to the prominent star Arcturus (Alpha Bootis) in Earth's sky, and Arcturus is in fact its closest stellar neighbor, as both stars are nearly identical in distance from the Sun. The two stars are about 3.24 light-years apart, and each would appear bright in the other's sky. Arcturus would appear as roughly magnitude -5.2 (about 120 times brighter than it appears from Earth, or close to twice the brightness of Venus) in the night sky of a hypothetical planet orbiting Eta Boötis, while Eta Boötis would appear at about magnitude −2.4 (absolute magnitude −2.41 at 0.99 parsec) in the sky of a hypothetical planet orbiting Arcturus, or over twice the brightness of Sirius in the night sky.

See also
 List of the nearest stars

References

External links
 STARS link
 The Constellations and Named Stars
 GJ 534
 CCDM J13547+1824
 Image Eta Boötis
 Richard Allen Hinkley, Star Names, Their Lore and Meaning (1889) 104

Bootis, 08
121370
067927
Boötes
Bootis, Eta
Spectroscopic binaries
G-type subgiants
Bootis, Eta
Muphrid
5235
Durchmusterung objects
0534